The governor of Nueva Ecija is the local chief executive of the Central Luzon province of Nueva Ecija in the Luzon Island, Philippines.

List
The following are the holders of the position since the post's formal establishment in 1898:

References

Governors of provinces of the Philippines
Politics of Nueva Ecija